Daine Laurie (born 20 July 1999) is a professional rugby league footballer who plays as a  for the Wests Tigers in the National Rugby League (NRL). 

He previously played for the Penrith Panthers in the NRL.

Background
Laurie was born in Sydney, but was raised in Iluka, New South Wales where his family is from. He is of Indigenous Australian descent, from the Bundjalung and Yaegl people, and is a relative of Cody Walker.
Laurie is the nephew of his namesake Daine Laurie.

Laurie played his junior rugby league for the Lower Clarence Magpies and Grafton Ghosts before joining the Penrith Panthers in 2017.

Playing career

Early years
In 2017, Laurie joined Penrith and played with their S. G. Ball Cup squad. In 2018, he was named Penrith's Jersey Flegg Cup player of the year.

2020
In August, Laurie made his first grade debut in round 13 of the 2020 NRL season for Penrith against the Canberra Raiders.

2021
Laurie signed with the Wests Tigers until the end of the 2023 season. However, it was announced on 2 August that he would miss the rest of the 2021 NRL season after suffering a broken fibula in the Wests Tigers round 20 loss against the New Zealand Warriors. Otherwise, Laurie had a breakout rookie season, which saw him nominated for the 2021 RLPA Players' Champion award.

On 6 October, a photo of Penrith-born Laurie wearing a jersey of his former club (Penrith) and celebrating that club's 2021 NRL Grand Final victory over South Sydney was shared to the media, despite him being contracted to the Wests Tigers. Laurie later apologised over the incident saying "Silly by me, silly mistake, but I am really sorry for it".

2022
Laurie played a total of 19 matches for the Wests Tigers in the 2022 NRL season.

In March, a Newcastle fan reportedly spotted Laurie and a Wests Tigers team-mate playing poker machines in a Newcastle hotel at 10pm on the eve of an unsuccessful Tigers match against Newcastle. The drama was described as "blown out of proportion". No NRL or club disciplinary action was taken as no integrity rules were breached.

On 25 September, Laurie scored a try for the 2022 Australian Men's Prime Minister's XIII in their 64-14 victory over the Papuan New Guinea Prime Minister's XIII at Suncorp Stadium.

References

External links
Wests Tigers profile
Penrith Panthers profile

1999 births
Living people
Australian rugby league players
Indigenous Australian rugby league players
Rugby league fullbacks
Rugby league players from Penrith, New South Wales
Penrith Panthers players
Wests Tigers players